The UCF Knights men's basketball statistical leaders are individual statistical leaders of the UCF Knights men's basketball program in various categories, including points, three-pointers, assists, blocks, rebounds, and steals. Within those areas, the lists identify single-game, single-season, and career leaders. The Knights represent the University of Central Florida in the NCAA Division I American Athletic Conference.

UCF began competing in intercollegiate basketball in 1969, initially as a club sport before upgrading to full varsity status in 1970–71. The Knights began their varsity existence as NCAA College Division members. When the NCAA split the College Division in 1973, creating today's Divisions II and III, UCF became a Division II member. The Knights did not move to D-I until the 1984–85 season.  By that time, the NCAA had resumed officially recording assists as a statistic in Division I; after recording that statistic for two seasons in the early 1950s, it stopped doing so until 1983–84. Blocks and steals were not officially recorded in D-I until the 1985–86 season. UCF's record books cover the entire history of UCF men's basketball, even in seasons in which the NCAA did not officially record the relevant statistics. These lists are updated through the end of the 2020–21 season.

Scoring

Rebounds

Assists

Steals

Blocks

References

Lists of college basketball statistical leaders by team
Statistical